The Courageux-class ships of the line were a class of six 74-gun third rates of the Royal Navy. This class of ship is sometimes referred to as the Leviathan class. A further two ships of the class were built to a slightly lengthened version of the Courageux draught. A final two ships were ordered to a third modification of the draught.

Ships

Standard group

Builder: Dudman, Deptford
Ordered: 14 July 1779
Launched: 21 January 1783
Fate: Broken up, 1825

Builder: Clevely, Gravesend
Ordered: 13 December 1781
Launched: 4 April 1787
Fate: Wrecked, 1798

Builder: Chatham Dockyard
Ordered: 9 December 1779
Launched: 9 October 1790
Fate: Sold out of the service, 1848

Builder: Woolwich Dockyard
Ordered: 3 December 1782
Launched: 6 November 1793
Fate: Wrecked, 1810

Lengthened group

Builder: Brindley, Frindsbury
Ordered: 24 November 1802
Launched: 18 November 1807
Fate: Sold, 1838

Builder: Deptford Dockyard
Ordered: 23 July 1805
Launched: 28 March 1808
Fate: Broken up, 1825

Modified group

Builder: Deptford Dockyard
Ordered: 30 October 1805
Launched: 23 August 1808
Fate: Sold, 1816

Builder: Woolwich Dockyard
Ordered: 30 October 1805
Launched: 3 March 1809
Fate: Sold, 1816

References

Lavery, Brian (2003) The Ship of the Line - Volume 1: The development of the battlefleet 1650-1850. Conway Maritime Press. .

 
Ship of the line classes